In the United States, a simple resolution is a legislative measure passed by only either the Senate or the House. As they have been passed by only one house, simple resolutions are not presented to the President, and do not have the force of law. The resolution is used for matters such as establishing the rules under which each body will operate.  This type of resolution is used to act or speak on behalf of only one chamber of congress.

See also
 Concurrent resolution
 Joint resolution
 Non-binding resolution
 Procedures of the United States Congress

References

 US Senate Glossary

Resolutions (law)